This is a list of episodes of Most Extreme Elimination Challenge.

Series overview
{|class="wikitable" style="text-align:center"
|-
! colspan="2" rowspan="2" |Season 
! rowspan="2" |Episodes 
! colspan="2" |Originally aired 
|-
! Season premiere 
! Season finale 
|-
| style="background:#6c6;"|
|1
|13
|April 19, 2003
|July 19, 2003
|-
| style="background:#6A9F9F;"|
|2
|13
|July 31, 2003
|November 6, 2003
|-
| style="background:#D76CD7;"| 
|3
|27
|April 22, 2004
|April 7, 2005
|-
| style="background:#8888FF;"|
|4
|15
|October 20, 2005
|March 9, 2006
|-
| style="background:#32f;"|
|5
|13
|November 9, 2006
|February 9, 2007
|-
|}

Episodes

Season 1 (2003)

Season 2 (2003)

Season 3 (2004–05)

Season 4 (2005–06)

Season 5 (2006–07)

External links
 

Lists of comedy television series episodes